Hugh McNeil (1878 – 10 January 1960) was a Scottish footballer who played as a centre half, with his longest spell being ten years with Motherwell. He had already spent a season with the club earlier in his career after graduating from the junior level, with Celtic (his time there including another loan back to Motherwell), Hamilton Academical and Morton his other Scottish Football League employers between his two main Fir Park spells. He survived a serious motorcycle crach in 1913, later going on to play for Wishaw Thistle and Royal Albert.

His son of the same name was also a footballer who too played for Motherwell and Hamilton in the same position.

References

1878 births
Date of birth unknown
1960 deaths
Scottish footballers
Footballers from Motherwell
Scottish Junior Football Association players
Scotland junior international footballers
Association football central defenders
Dalziel Rovers F.C. players
Hamilton Academical F.C. players
Motherwell F.C. players
Celtic F.C. players
Greenock Morton F.C. players
Wishaw Thistle F.C. players
Royal Albert F.C. players
Scottish Football League players